East Baton Rouge Parish Library (EBRPL) is the public library system of East Baton Rouge Parish, Louisiana. It serves Baton Rouge and other cities in the parish.

History
The East Baton Rouge Public Library was established in 1939 with the donation of second-hand collected books from the city. Quick to expand, the library had eight branches within its first three years as a system.

Since 1986 the library has been funded by a 10-year dedicated property tax. This tax, funded at 11.1 mills, provides funding for all library operations, improvements, and salaries. While the tax was lowered to 10.78 mills in the early 2000s it was raised back to 11.1 mills in 2015. Its most recent renewal was on October 24, 2015.

Libraries
Main Library
Baker Branch Library - Baker
Bluebonnet Regional Branch Library
Carver Branch Library
Central Branch Library - Central
Delmont Gardens Branch Library
Eden Park Branch Library
Fairwood Branch Library
Greenwell Springs Regional Branch - Monticello (unincorporated area)
Jones Creek Regional Branch Library - Shenandoah (unincorporated area)
Pride-Chaneyville Branch Library - Pride (unincorporated area)
River Center Branch Library
Scotlandville Branch Library
Zachary Branch Library - Zachary

References

External links

 East Baton Rouge Parish Library

Library
Baton Rouge, Louisiana
Public libraries in Louisiana